"I Almost Lost My Mind" is a popular song written by Ivory Joe Hunter and published in 1950. Hunter's recording of the song was a number one hit on the US Billboard R&B chart in that year.

In this song, the narrator, whose lover had left him, for no reason at all, had almost lost his mind. He goes to see the gypsy to have his fortune read, who turns out to be bad news, stating that his lover had left him forever, gone for good.

The recording of the 12-bar blues by R&B star Ivory Joe Hunter was made on October 1, 1949 and was a rhythm and blues hit that became a pop standard. The best selling version of the song was a cover version by Pat Boone, hitting number one on the Billboard charts in 1956.

It has since been recorded by a variety of pop artists, big bands, country and western stars, rock and rollers, and Latin, jazz and blues performers. Big Walter Horton's instrumental "Easy", recorded in 1953, was based on "I Almost Lost My Mind".

Recorded versions

Elton Britt 1955
Ray Anthony 1962   
Eddy Arnold 1973
Bill Black 1960
Jeanne Black 1961 
Pat Boone 1956 
Ray Bryant 1965
Solomon Burke 1962
Jerry Butler 1963
Chubby Checker 1961
Eddie Cochran 1963
Nat King Cole 1950
Cookie & The Cupcakes 1974 
James Cotton 2004
Bing Crosby recorded the song in 1956 for use on his radio show and it was subsequently included in the box set The Bing Crosby CBS Radio Recordings (1954-56) issued by Mosaic Records (catalog MD7-245) in 2009. 
Arthur Big Boy Crudup 1997
Blind John Davis
The Spencer Davis Group
Fats Domino 1978
Duane Eddy - Have 'Twangy' Guitar Will Travel (1958)
The Everly Brothers 1965
Georgie Fame 1995
Mary Flower 2001
Connie Francis - Rock 'n' Roll Million Sellers (1959)
Bill Haley & His Comets 1960
Lionel Hampton 1950 
The Harptones 1955
Woody Herman 1971
Big Walter Horton
Ivory Joe Hunter 1949
Ferlin Husky 1967
Joni James 1962
Nigel Kennedy 2006 
Albert King 1967
The Legendary Blues Band 1983
Barbara Mandrell 1971
Gene McDaniels 1962
Wes Montgomery 2001  
Mouth & MacNeal 1972
Willie Nelson 1985
Pinetop Perkins 1995
Alan Price 1977
Louis Prima 1950 
Charlie Rich 1970
Demis Roussos 1984
Saffire - The Uppity Blues Women 1990
Jimmy Smith 1964 
Keely Smith 1950 
Hank Snow 1975 
Floyd Tillman 1950
Ernest Tubb 1964 
Conway Twitty 1963 
Billy Vaughn 1959 
Fran Warren 1950
The Wilburn Brothers 1960 
Zalman Yanovsky 1968

See also
List of number-one R&B singles of 1950 (U.S.)
List of number-one singles of 1956 (U.S.)

References 

1950 singles
1950 songs
1956 singles
Songs written by Ivory Joe Hunter
Jeanne Black songs
Pat Boone songs
Eddie Cochran songs
Nat King Cole songs
Bill Haley songs
Number-one singles in the United States